is a Japanese singer-songwriter and musician under Universal Sigma. Raised in Satoshō, Okayama in Japan, he began uploading covers to YouTube since the age of 12. He released his first studio album, Help Ever Hurt Never in 2020, which reached number one on the Billboard Japan Hot Albums chart and number two on the Oricon Albums Chart.

Biography

Early musical beginnings 
Fujii Kaze was born in 1997 in Satoshō in Okayama, Japan, and has one older brother and two older sisters. As a child, he listened to all kinds of music such as jazz, classical music, pop, and enka. Starting at 12 years old, Fujii uploaded various piano and vocal cover videos on his personal YouTube channel, amassing more than 30 million views. During his high school years, he suspended uploading to focus on his musical studies; he returned to YouTube after he graduated. In early 2019, he moved to Tokyo.

2019–2020: Major label debut, Help Ever Hurt Never 

Fujii released his debut single, "何なんw (WTF LOL)" on November 18, 2019, and his second single, "もうええわ (Mo-Eh-Wa)" on December 24. Each single was re-released digitally with its own extended play, with each EP including cover songs that can only be downloaded on Apple Music.   

In January 2020, he was named as one of Spotify's "Early Noise 2020" Top 10 Breaking Artists. One-man live performances in the form of Nan-Nan Show 2020 were scheduled for April 4 and 26 at Zepp Namba and Zepp Tokyo respectively, but were cancelled due to the COVID-19 pandemic. 

Fujii released his first studio album Help Ever Hurt Never on May 20, 2020, and reached number one on the Billboard Japan Hot Albums chart. He also announced his first national hall tour, which consists of 12 performances in 11 cities from December 25, 2020, to January 31, 2021. In August 2020, he became the first Japanese person to be a YouTube's Artist on the Rise. Immediately after Fujii Kaze "Nan-Nan Show 2020" Help Ever Hurt Never at Nippon Budokan, Fujii released two new singles: "Hedemo Ne-Yo" and "Seishun Sick" on October 30. Each single was released digitally with its own extended play and selection of cover songs.

2021: Two tie-ups, Nissan stadium "Free" live and 1st NHK Kohaku appearance 

In January 2021, “Tabiji” started airing on TV Asahi as the theme song for a TV drama series "Nijiiro Carte “ (Rainbow Color Medical Records / にじいろカルテ). This was the first time Fujii's song was used as a tie-up. The song was digitally released as the 7th single on March 1, and on the same day Fujii performed the song live with piano during the TV news program "Houdo Station" (TV Asahi), which was his first live TV appearance. The song won first place in the Oricon Weekly Digital Single Ranking which was announced on March 10th. 

On March 8 , Fujii won the "BEST BREAKTHROUGH ARTIST" award at " SPACE SHOWER MUSIC AWARDS 2021". In addition to that, the music video for "Seishun Sick" won the "BEST CONCEPTUAL VIDEO" award.  Fujii gave a live performance of "Seishun Sick" with piano and was broadcast on Space Shower TV.  

On March 10 , Fujii won the "Popular New Artist " Award at the 33rd Music Pen Club Music Awards . Furthermore, on March 23 , "HELP EVER HURT NEVER" won the Grand Prize <Blue>  of  "13th CD Shop Awards".  

On April 22nd  " Kirari " started airing in the new Honda VEZEL TV ad. "Kirari" was later released as Fujii's 8th single on May 3.  The song led to an explosion of his popularity internationally, debuting at number one on the Billboard Japan Download Songs chart.　The music video of "Kirari" was released on the official YouTube channel on May 21, which incorporated dance and motorcycle scenes that Fujii requested by himself for the first time, according to Fujii's 'After Talk' live streaming. "Kirari" surpassed 100 million streamings in August 2021 and 300 million streamings in June 2022. On January 14th of the following year, Fujii digitally released a remix EP "Kirari Remixes (Asia Edition) " . 

On May 20, 2021 in commemoration of the 1st anniversary of "HELP EVER HURT NEVER", "HELP EVER HURT COVER " which was originally came with the 1st edition of " HELP EVER HURT NEVER" as a bonus disc, was reprinted and also digitally released. "HELP EVER HURT COVER" contains 11 English cover songs.  Along with this, the analog record of "HELP EVER HURT NEVER" was also resold (limited quantity production by lottery)  . 

In August 2021, Fujii was named one of the most exciting musicians around the world by GQ. 

On September 4 , " Fujii Kaze "Free" Live 2021 at NISSAN stadium " was held at Nissan Stadium in Kanagawa, Japan. This performance was live-streamed on Fujii's official YouTube channel for free, and about 180,000 people watched it simultaneously, recording the world's No.1 trending word. On the same day, Fujii performed " Mo-E-Yo " for the first time and the song was released as a digital single. 

On December 31, 2021, Fujii performed on the prestigious year-end music program, NHK Kohaku Uta Gassen.

2022–present: Love All Serve All 

On January 14, 2022, Fujii released the EP Kirari Remixes (Asia Edition). Fujii released his second studio album, Love All Serve All, on March 23, 2022.  

Since July 2022, Fujii was brought to the attention of a global audience thanks to one of his songs, "Shinunoga E-Wa", going viral on TikTok. This song was released as part of his debut album Help Ever Hurt Never back in 2020. 

On October 10, 2022, Fujii released the digital single "Grace". The song served as the theme song for his collaboration with NTT Docomo, Japan's largest telecommunications company's "Kaze Films Docomo Future Project". The project films were broadcast as TV commercials throughout Japan for few months. Fujii shot "Grace"'s music video in Uttarakhand, India.

In October 2022, Fujii performed at the Panasonic Stadium Suita in Osaka, Japan, attracting 70,000 people in two days. On March 10, 2023, this performance has started to broadcast only on  Netflix as "Fujii Kaze Love All Serve All Stadium Live".

On December 17, 2022, Fujii kicked off the nationwide arena tour "Fujii Kaze Love All Arena Tour"  of 16 shows in 8 cities throughout Japan until February 2023, attracting a total of 210,000 people.

Artistry 
Fujii's music has been described as "fresh yet familiar", with clear influence stemming from the western music he grew up with. His vocals are "reminiscent of Japan's kayōkyoku pop standards", making his music also distinctly Japanese.

Discography

Studio albums

Cover albums

Extended plays

Singles

Other charted and certified songs

Music videos

Awards and nominations

References

External links 

1997 births
Living people
Japanese male pop singers
Japanese male singer-songwriters
Musicians from Okayama Prefecture
Universal Music Japan artists
People in vegetarianism
21st-century Japanese male singers